The 2000 Michigan 500 was the eleventh round of the twenty-round 2000 CART season. It happened at the Michigan International Speedway.

Qualifying

The Canadian driver Paul Tracy, from Team Green, set the pole, followed by Michael Andretti and Christian Fittipaldi.

  Eligible for Rookie of the Year

Race

Eventual winner Juan Pablo Montoya led the race at the end of the first lap through to lap 16, where he was overtaken by eventual runner up Michael Andretti. Across the 250 laps, the race saw nine different leaders, with 52 lead changes. There were five cautions over the course of the race, taking 38 laps in total. Thirteen cars did not finish the race, and only seven cars completed the full 500-mile distance. The race culminated in a battle between Montoya and Andretti, with seven lead changes in the final twenty laps. Montoya set the race's fastest lap on lap 232 of 250. Andretti led lap 249, but was passed by Montoya on the final lap. Montoya's margin of victory was just 0.040s. Montoya's victory was Toyota's second in ChampCar, and he became the first driver since Rick Mears in 1991 to win both the Indy 500 and Michigan 500 in the same year.

Championship Battle

Michael Andretti became the new leader of the championship with 100 points. The previous leader, Roberto Moreno was in 2nd with 90 points. Race winner Juan Pablo Montoya moved up to 5th in the Championship standings with 74 points.

Standings after the race

Note: Only the top five positions are included for the drivers' standings.

References

Michigan 500, 2000
Michigan Indy 400